Pesser is a surname. Notable people with the surname include:

Dirck Pesser ( 1585–1651), Dutch businessman
Hans Pesser (1911–1986), Austrian footballer and manager

See also
Hesser
Messer (surname)
Posser (surname)
Tesser